Kick IIIII (stylized as kiCK iiiii) is the eighth studio album by Venezuelan record producer and singer Arca. The album was surprise released on 3 December 2021 as the fifth and final entry in the Kick quintet. The album was released with no singles or prior announcement.

Background 
Upon the release of Kick I, news surfaced that Arca would be releasing two more Kick albums to make a trilogy. The artist took to Pitchfork to say: "There will be four volumes. The third one is a little bit more introverted than Kick I, a little bit more like my self-titled album, I guess. The fourth one is piano only, no vocals. Right now, the least defined one, strangely, is the third one. It's all gestating right now [...] Each Kick exists in a kind of quantum state until the day that I send it to mastering. I try to not commit until I have to. But I have a vision for it. The second one is heavy on backbeats, vocal manipulation, mania, and craziness."

Kick IIIII would end up being similar to Arca's previous description of the fourth entry, focusing entirely on quieter ambient pieces, focused mainly on piano, plucked strings and swirling pads. Famed Japanese composer Ryuichi Sakamoto makes a guest vocal appearance on "Sanctuary".

Critical reception

On review aggregate site Metacritic, Kick IIIII received a score of 77 out of 100, based on reviews from 13 critics, indicating "generally favorable reviews".

Track listing

Sample credits

 "Sanctuary" contains samples of previous Arca tracks:  "Ave María", "Gestation" & "La Exorcista"

Interpolates
  
 "Sanctuary" contains interpolation of previous Arca tracks: "Construct", "Diva" & "Alien Inside"
 "Fireprayer" contains interpolation of "Fire Meet Gasoline" by Sia

References

Arca (musician) albums
2021 albums
Surprise albums
XL Recordings albums
Albums produced by Arca (musician)
Ambient albums
Contemporary classical music albums
Electroacoustic music albums
Sequel albums